Gesnouinia is a small genus of flowering plants in the family Urticaceae (the nettle family). Two species are accepted by The Plant List :

 Gesnouinia arborea (L.f.) Gaudich.
 Gesnouinia filamentosa Wedd.

Description
Gesnouinia species are shrubs with monoecious flowers (i.e. separate "male" and "female" flowers on the same plant). Two staminate ("male") flowers and one carpellate ("female") flower are grouped in each bract (involucre), which are then clustered into a panicle. The male flowers have a calyx made up of four sepals and four stamens. The female flowers have an included ovary and a short style.

References

Urticaceae
Urticaceae genera
Taxa named by Charles Gaudichaud-Beaupré